Adam Masalachi (born 3 January 1994) is a Ghanaian professional footballer who plays for Ethiopian club Suhul Shire as a centre-back.

Early life
Adam Masalachi born in Sabonjida, a suburb of Tamale in the Northern Region of Ghana. As a child Adam Masalachi played for an amateur team in Tamale known as Real Republicans F.C. In 2009 his team emerged third in the colts milo championship in Bolga, Ghana. He also participated in S.H.S inter-school championship games in 2010 year where their team emerged second in the tournament.

Career
In the year 2011 Adam Masalachi was signed by a 2nd division team Galaxy F.C. now Steadfast F.C from the Republican F.C. In his first participation in the tournament his defensive skills contributed to their team playing unbeaten in the 1st round and eventually qualified to the Poly Tank division One League in Ghana. He scored 3 goals in the tournament.

Adam Masalachi made his first debuts for Al Egtmaaey Tripoli FC (Lebanon Team) on the 25th of August 2015 and the game was against Salam Zgharta Fc where he inspired  Al Egtmaaey Tripoli FC to win 2–1. Adam Masalachi played loan in his first season and secured a contract in the second round. He also helped the newly promoted team to secure a 6th position in the top flight of the Alpha Lebanese premier league.

References

External links

1994 births
Living people
Ghanaian footballers
People from Tamale, Ghana
Association football defenders
Futuro Kings FC players
Ghanaian expatriate footballers
Ghanaian expatriate sportspeople in Lebanon
Ghanaian expatriate sportspeople in Equatorial Guinea
Ghanaian expatriate sportspeople in Ethiopia
Expatriate footballers in Equatorial Guinea
Expatriate footballers in Lebanon
Expatriate footballers in Ethiopia
Lebanese Premier League players
Al Egtmaaey SC players
Mekelle 70 Enderta F.C. players
Ethiopian Premier League players